Elisabeth Johanna Maria "Lies" Bonnier (born 8 July 1925) is a Dutch retired swimmer who won a silver medal at the 1950 European Aquatics Championships in the 200 m breaststroke. In 1952, after winning a national title, she competed in the same event at the Summer Olympics, but was eliminated in preliminaries. On 17 November 1953 she married Chris Burg.

References

1925 births
Living people
European Aquatics Championships medalists in swimming
Dutch female breaststroke swimmers
Olympic swimmers of the Netherlands
Sportspeople from 's-Hertogenbosch
Swimmers at the 1952 Summer Olympics